Polistes major castaneicolor is a subspecies of red paper wasp found in the Sonoran Desert. It ranges from Arizona, United States, to Sonora, Mexico.

Taxonomy 
P. major castaneicolor is one of the five subspecies of Polistes major, along with Polistes major bonaccensis, Polistes major columbianus, Polistes major major, and Polistes major weyrauchi. The subspecies was first described by Joseph Charles Bequaert in 1936.

Description 
This subspecies has a completely reddish body with at most yellow on the inner orbits, fore coxae, and tarsi. It is notably convergent in coloration with P. canadensis, which co-occurs within the range of P. m. castaneicolor.

References

major castaneicolor
Taxa named by Joseph Charles Bequaert
Insects described in 1936
Subspecies